Maiestas obongsanensis (formerly Recilia obongsanensis) is a species of bug from the Cicadellidae. It is found on Mount Obongsan, Gangwon-do province of South Korea, and can also be found in Honshu and Tsushima. It was formerly placed within Recilia, but a 2009 revision moved it to Maiestas.

References

Insects described in 1979
Endemic fauna of South Korea
Hemiptera of Asia
Maiestas